Ambush Bug: Year None is a six-issue comic book limited series written by Keith Giffen and Robert Loren Fleming, and illustrated by Keith Giffen and Al Milgrom. The first issue, "Hey, You Sank My Battle-Ax!", was published on July 23, 2008. DC Comics announced that instead of releasing a sixth issue, the series would skip issue #6 and conclude with issue #7. Ambush Bug: Year None #7 was released on October 28, 2009.

Plot
The first issue, "Hey, You Sank My Battle-Ax!", revolves around Ambush Bug trying to solve the murder of Jonni DC, a female version of Johnny DC. Recognizing that the murder of a female character that advances the plot of a male protagonist is problematic, the beginning of the story explicitly calls out the "Women in Refrigerators" trope, with a panel of Ambush Bug trying to buy a refrigerator that doesn't have a female corpse in it. Through the course of the story, Ambush Bug encounters such DC Comics characters as Yankee Poodle, Egg Fu, Ace the Bat-Hound and 'Mazing Man. Through the course of his investigation, he is pursued by his evil sock enemy, Argh!Yle! and his minions bent on Ambush Bug's destruction. Also pursuing him is "Go-Go Chex", a mysterious being whose face is completely covered with the checkerboard pattern that appeared at the top of DC comic covers during the 1960s; he constantly speaks in 1960s phrases and slang and refers to everyone around him as "Wonder Chick". Occasionally, the Source Wall, as a sentient slab of concrete, appears vacationing across time and space in places where Ambush Bug passes.

The second issue makes fun of Zatanna's mindwipe of the Justice League of America, Rama Kushna, OMACs (who appear to take the places of all normal, background humans), Babe the Blue Ox from Jack of Fables, the Space Ranger, the Green Lantern Corps, Zook, Mister Nebula and Blue Beetle's death. Go-Go Chex continues to pursue Ambush Bug. In the Mister Nebula segment, he briefly takes on the uniform of the Amber Butane Corps, a lampooning of the Green Lantern Corps that wields a sentient lighter instead of a ring.

In the third issue, Ambush Bug discovers that he and the Dumb Bunny (a member of the Inferior Five) got married in Las Vegas while he was drunk. He spends most of the issue running from one reality to another trying to find a way out of his marriage; along the way he encounters Neron (whom he asks to nullify his marriage in a spoof of the Marvel Comics storyline "Spider-Man: One More Day"), Darkseid (whom he goes to a karaoke bar with), Super-Turtle (who wreaks massive destruction, à la Superboy-Prime), Jerro the Merboy, the Odd Man and Go-Go Chex and his assistant Saki Toomi ("Sock it to me").

The fourth issue starts by referencing a mistake made in issue #2, where one page was printed without its dialogue balloons. DC editor Dan DiDio takes responsibility for the mistake despite having nothing to do with it, a jab at the angry reaction from fans when certain characters were changed or killed off without him having anything to do with it. Dan DiDio is crushed and killed by a falling Ambush Bug and Argh!Yle starts to believe that he and Ambush Bug are actually one and the same. The issue continues mostly without Ambush Bug for the first half, focusing on lesser characters Argh!Yle and Mitsu Bishi as a parody of the series 52. In trying to find Ambush Bug they feature the Golden Age Robin, Renee Montoya and most of the main characters from 52. Near the end, Ambush Bug chats with Argh!Yle on Wonder Woman's invisible speaker phone and confirms that he is alive and is not Dan DiDio. He then gets kidnapped by the Ambush Bug Revenge Squad, who argue over obscure comic book quotations while Ambush Bug gets bored and escapes.

The final issue of the miniseries had been delayed for more than six months for undisclosed reasons. Fans have speculated that the delay was related to the departure of DC’s Senior Coordinating Editor Jann Jones from the company, as she was included in the story as a character. The final issue of the series was released on October 28, 2009.

References

2008 comics debuts
Metafictional comics
Comics by Keith Giffen